Alexander S. Dynin (Александр С. Дынин) is a Russian mathematician at Ohio State University who introduced the Agranovich–Dynin formula. Since 2009, Dynin claims to have proved the Yang-Mills Millennium Problem.

References

External links

Alexander Dynin

Russian mathematicians
Year of birth missing (living people)
Living people
Soviet mathematicians